Events from the year 1997 in Denmark.

Incumbents
 Monarch - Margrethe II
 Prime minister - Poul Nyrup Rasmussen

Events
 13 July–23 July – The 1997 Summer Deaflympics are held in Copenhagen.

The arts

Sports

Badminton
 24 May  1 June  Denmark wins one gold medal, one silver medal and two bronze medals at the 1997 IBF World Championships.
 Hvidovre BK wins the Europe Cup.

Cycling
 6 April – Rolf Sørensen wins the Tour of Flanders classic road cycling race.
 26 April – Bjarne Riis wins the 1997 Amstel Gold Race.
 27 July – Bjarne Riis finishes as number 7 in the 1997 Tour de France.
 October – Rolf Sørensen finishes second in the Züri-Metzgete road cycling race.
  Jimmi Madsen (DEN) and Jens Veggerby (DEN) win the Six Days of Copenhagen sox-day track cycling race.

Football
 7 May  F.C. Copenhagen wins the 1996–97 Danish Cup by defeating Ikast FC 20 in the final.

Handball
 December 14 — Denmark wins gold at the 1997 World Women's Handball Championship in Germany by defeating Norway 33–20 in the final.

Swimming
 1824  1997 European Aquatics Championships
 19 August  Denmark wins a bronze medal in Women's 4 × 200 metre freestyle relay.
 22 August Mette Jacobsen wins a gold medal in Women's 100 metre butterfly
 24 August Mette Jacobsen wins a bronze medal in Women's 200 metre butterfly.

Other
 March 8 — Wilson Kipketer wins gold in Men's 800 metres at the 1997 IAAF World Indoor Championships in Paris, France.
 May — Mads Larsen becomes IBO super middleweight Champion after a fourth-round knockout win over American Shannon Landberg.
 15 June — Tom Kristensen wins Le Mans for the first time as part of the Joest Racing team.
 August — Wilson Kipketer wins gold in Men's 800 metres at the 1997 World Championships in Athletics in Athens, Greece.
 24 August — Wilson Kipketer sets his third world record in the men's 800 metres that year with the time 1:41.11.
 6 September
 Lars Michaelsen wins the first stage of the 1997 Vuelta a España and wears the leader's jersey for three days.
 Hans Nielsen wins the 1987 Individual Speedway World Championship at the Olympic Stadium in Amsterdam.
 12 October — Bo Hamburger wins silver in Men's road race at the 1997 UCI Road World Championships.

Births
27 April – Anders Antonsen, badminton player
19 August – Mia Blichfeldt, badminton player
6 October – Kasper Dolberg, professional footballer
28 October – Justin Shaibu, professional footballer 
9 December – Alexander Bah, professional footballer

Deaths
 23 January – Hardy Rafn, actor (born 1930)
 3 March – Finn Høffding, composer (born 1899)
 10 March – Johannes Theodor Suhr, Roman Catholic bishop (born 1896)
 5 November – Niels Macholm, painter and graphic artist (born 1915)
 17 December – Marie Gudme Leth (born 1895)

See also
1997 in Danish television

References

 
Denmark
Years of the 20th century in Denmark
1990s in Denmark